Unleashed is a 2016 American romantic comedy written and directed by Finn Taylor and starring Kate Micucci, Justin Chatwin, Steve Howey, Sean Astin and Hana Mae Lee.

Plot 
When a cosmic event turns Emma's dog Summit and cat Ajax into two perfect guys, Emma reconsiders her outlook on dating, hilariously works out her trust issues, and ultimately learns to love herself.

Cast 
 Kate Micucci as Emma
 Justin Chatwin as Diego / Ajax
 Steve Howey as Sam / Summit
 Sean Astin as Carl
 Hana Mae Lee as Nina
 Josh Brener as Luke
 Illeana Douglas as Monty
 Kathy Garver as Jean
 Scott Coffey as Leather Dude

Production 
On June 4, 2015, it was announced Kate Micucci, Justin Chatwin and Steve Howey signed on for the film. On June 18, 2015, it was announced Sean Astin, Hana Mae Lee, Josh Brener and Illeana Douglas joined the cast of the film.

Principal photography began on June 30, 2015, in San Francisco.

Release
The film had its world premiere at the Mill Valley Film Festival on October 12, 2016. Level 33 Entertainment acquired the domestic distribution rights and released the film on August 25, 2017, in select theaters and through video on demand.

Critical reception
Unleashed received positive reviews from critics. On Rotten Tomatoes the film holds an 75% rating, based on 8 reviews. Frank Scheck of The Hollywood Reporter gave the film a positive review writing: "Although it never quite lives up to the satirical possibilities of its high-concept premise, Unleashed delivers some mildly enjoyable laughs thanks to its engaging female lead and the exuberantly physical performances of her co-stars."

References

External links
 
 

2016 films
2016 romantic comedy films
American romantic comedy films
2010s English-language films
2010s American films